Morge may refer to:

Morge (Isère), a tributary of the Isère
, a tributary of the Allier
Morge (Lake Geneva), a tributary of Lake Geneva
Le Morge, a frazione (subdivision) in the Abruzzo region of Italy

People with the surname
Günter Morge (1925–1984), German entomologist

See also
Morges